Farah Mohamed (born 1970) is a Canadian women's rights activist, public speaker, and business leader who founded G(irls)20, an annual event to bring together women from across the world. She has previously served as the CEO of the Malala Fund, a non-profit organisation that advocates for girls' education. She spent almost a decade working with Canadian politicians on Parliament Hill. 

She is the recipient of a Meritorious Service Medal, a Queen Elizabeth II Diamond Jubilee Medal and one of the recipients of the 2014 Top 25 Canadian Immigrant Awards presented by Canadian Immigrant Magazine. In 2014, she was also recognized as one of the BBC's 100 women.

Early life and education 
She was born 1970 in Uganda. Her parents sought refuge in Canada in 1972 after Asians were expulsed from Uganda, and settled in St. Catharines, Ontario.

She holds a Bachelor of Arts from Queens University and a Master of Arts and an Honorary Doctorate of Laws from the University of Western Ontario.

G(irls)20 
In 2010, she founded G(irls)20, an annual event to empower women from each of the G20 countries and Africa. Each year in advance of the G20 summit, G(irls)20 brings together women for a week of leadership training and advocacy. She served as CEO of G(irls)20 for 5 years until she became CEO of the Malala Fund.

References 

1970 births
Living people
Canadian women's rights activists
Queen's University at Kingston alumni
Canadian women business executives
Canadian business executives
BBC 100 Women